In optical engineering and telecommunications engineering, the flick is a unit of spectral radiance. One flick corresponds to a  spectral radiance of 1 watt per steradian per square centimeter of surface per micrometer of span in wavelength (W·sr−1·cm−2·μm−1). This is  equivalent to 1010 watts per steradian per cubic meter (W·sr−1·m−3). In practice, spectral radiance is typically measured in microflicks (10−6 flicks). One microflick is equivalent to 10 kilowatts per steradian per cubic meter (kW·sr−1·m−3).

History
In radio astronomy, the unit flik was coined by a group at Lockheed in Palo Alto, California as a substitute for the SI derived unit W cm−2 sr−1 µm−1, or watts divided by centimeters squared, steradians, and micrometers. While originally used only at Lockheed, many in the radio astronomy field adopted its use.

References

Units of measurement
Radio astronomy
Radiometry